"Vem tänder stjärnorna?" is a single released by Swedish singer Eva Dahlgren from her1991 album En blekt blondins hjärta.

The song won a Grammis for Song of the Year.

Music video
The music video shows images of Eva Dahlgren and Stellan Skarsgård by the water.

Other versions
The English version, also performed by Dahlgren, is "I'm Not in Love With You".

Charts

References

1991 singles
1991 songs
Eva Dahlgren songs